The Chemical Wedding is a compilation album by Danielle Dax released exclusively in Japan in November 1987, containing rare and previously unreleased songs.

Eight songs are included on this album, four of which had been previously released as B-sides to singles from Inky Bloaters, while the other four songs had not been released in the U.K. before.  Of the four previously unreleased songs, three would appear the following year on the U.S. compilation album Dark Adapted Eye in the form of new mixes/masters and even a new recording.

Track listing 

Note: The songs "Touch Piggy's Eyes," "Whistling for His Love," "Cat-House" (re-recorded version), and "When I Was Young" were later included on the 1988 U.S. compilation Dark Adapted Eye.  All eight songs were included on the 1995 U.K. compilation Comatose-Non-Reaction ("Cat-House" and "Whistling" are the re-recorded/remixed versions).  Some songs had the mixdown tapes deliberately sped up during mastering for inclusion on later releases; "Touch Piggy's Eyes" and "When I Was Young" on Comatose are 4:05 and 3:48 respectively as a result.

Credits
Music and arrangements by Danielle Dax and David Knight.
Lyrics by Danielle Dax.
Recorded at Fortress Dax; additional recording and mixing at Alaska Studios and Greenhouse Studios.

 Danielle Dax - Vocals, keyboards, guitar, saxophone, percussion, producer, initial recording, cover artwork
 Karl Blake - Guitar 
 Pete Farrugia - Guitar 
 David Knight - Guitar, percussion, keyboards, tape 
 Trevor Reidy - Drums
 Chad Strentz - Harmonica
 Ian Sturgess - Bass guitar
 Iain O'Higgins - Recording and mixing engineer
 Jessica Corcoran - Assistant engineer

References

External links
Danielle Dax Official Website
Danielle Dax Myspace Site
The Danielle Dax Profile

1987 albums
Danielle Dax albums
VAP (company) albums